Dennis John may refer to:

 Dennis John (rugby union), former rugby union coach and player
 Dennis John (footballer) (1935–2013), former footballer

See also
 Dennis St John (1928–2007), British actor